The 75th Avenue station (originally 75th Avenue–Puritan Avenue station) is a local station on the IND Queens Boulevard Line of the New York City Subway. Located at the intersection of 75th Avenue and Queens Boulevard in Forest Hills, Queens, it is served by the F train at all times, the E train at all times except weekday rush hours and middays, and the <F> train during rush hours in the reverse peak direction.

The station opened on December 31, 1936 as a station along the Independent Subway System's Queens Boulevard Line. The opening of the station brought significant growth to the adjacent community of Forest Hills, transforming it from a quiet residential community to an active population center.

History

Construction and opening

The Queens Boulevard Line was one of the first built by the city-owned Independent Subway System (IND), and was planned to stretch between the IND Eighth Avenue Line in Manhattan and 178th Street and Hillside Avenue in Jamaica, Queens, with a stop at 75th Avenue. The line was first proposed in 1925. Construction of the line was approved by the New York City Board of Estimate on October 4, 1928. As planned, 75th Avenue was to be a local stop; it would be one of 22 total stops on the line between Seventh Avenue in Manhattan and 178th Street in Queens. The line was constructed using the cut-and-cover tunneling method, and to allow pedestrians to cross, temporary bridges were built over the trenches.

Early planning documents called for a station at "Queens Boulevard–Puritan Avenue"; Puritan Avenue was the name for 75th Road in Forest Hills Gardens. For the first few years of operation the station was referred to as Puritan Avenue. The design called for a small mezzanine but 75th Avenue was built with a full one as it was cheaper than filling in the excavation.

The first section of the line opened on August 19, 1933 from the connection to the Eighth Avenue Line at 50th Street to Roosevelt Avenue in Jackson Heights. Later that year, a $23 million loan was approved to finance the remainder of the line, along with other IND lines. The remainder of the line was built by the Public Works Administration. In 1934 and 1935, construction of the extension to Jamaica was suspended for 15 months and was halted by strikes. Construction was further delayed due to a strike in 1935, instigated by electricians opposing wages paid by the General Railway Signal Company. In August 1936, tracks were installed all the way to 178th Street, and the stations to Union Turnpike were completed.

The construction of the extension to Kew Gardens brought significant growth to Queens, specifically in Forest Hills and Kew Gardens. With the subway providing a quick and cheap commute, Forest Hills became a more desirable place to live, and as a result new apartment buildings were built in advance of the line's opening to accommodate the expected influx of residents. Forest Hills was transformed from a quiet residential community of one-family houses to an active population center.

Between July and October 1938, the entrance to the southeastern corner of 75th Road and Queens Boulevard opened. This entrance opened due to increased ridership from six new apartment buildings in the area. The owners of these six new apartment buildings, Cord Meyer Development Company, local homeowners, and civic associations placed pressure on the New York City Board of Transportation to open the entrance in July 1938. On December 15, 1940,  trains began running via the newly opened IND Sixth Avenue Line and along the Queens Boulevard Line's express tracks; they skipped the 75th Avenue station.

Platform extensions
In 1953, the platforms at six Queens Boulevard Line stations, including 75th Avenue, were lengthened to allow eleven-car trains. The bid for the project went out in 1951. The lengthened trains began running during rush hour on September 8, 1953. Eleven-car trains would only operate on weekdays. The extra car increased the total carrying capacity by 4,000 passengers. The lengthening project cost $400,000 (equivalent to $ in ). The operation of eleven-car trains ended in 1958 because of operational difficulties. The signal blocks, especially in Manhattan, were too short to accommodate the longer trains, and the motormen had a very small margin of error to properly platform the train. It was found that operating ten-car trains allowed for two additional trains per hour to be scheduled.

Station layout 

This local station has four tracks and two side platforms. The F train stops here at all times, while the E train uses the two center tracks to bypass this station weekdays (Manhattan-bound from approximately 6:00 a.m. to 6:30 p.m., Jamaica-bound from 7:30 a.m. to 8:00 p.m.).

Both platforms have a light Fern green trim line with a black border and "75TH AVE" tile captions in white lettering on a black background beneath them. There are mosaic name tablets reading "75TH AVE." in white sans-serif font on a black background with a light Fern green border, and beneath them are directional tile signs in white lettering on a black background pointing to the exits. Emerald green I-beam columns run along both platforms at regular intervals, alternating ones having the standard black station name plate with white lettering. The trackside columns have old white "75TH AVE" signs on them in black lettering. The former name of Puritan Avenue was still reflected on platform signage into the 1990s.

Exits
The station has a full-length mezzanine above the platforms and tracks. All of the mezzanine is still completely open, with the exception of a tiny closed fenced-off section at the station's eastern end that is accessed from a single closed staircase on the Manhattan-bound platform. However, it is set up in a way that does not allow a free transfer between directions, as the fare control is located in the middle of the mezzanine. The token booth and turnstile banks for either direction are at the center. HEET turnstiles are at either ends near the station's entrances and exits, both of which have two street stairs. The entrance at the west (railroad south) end leads to the northwest corner and southwest corners of Queens Boulevard and 75th Avenue, while the one on the east (railroad north) end leads to southeast corner of Queens Boulevard and 75th Road. Chain-link fences separate the sections of the mezzanine within fare control and the section out of fare control. The section of the mezzanine within fare control used to span across the entire space, but a fare-free underpass under Queens Boulevard now divides the northbound and southbound parts of the mezzanine, and there is no way to make a free transfer between the two platforms anymore.

Track layout
There are two diamond switches near the western end of this station, located between the local and express tracks in each direction. This switch is used in revenue service. E and F trains use it to switch from the Queens Boulevard express tracks to the local tracks, allowing them to stop at 75th Avenue. The F uses these switches at all times, while the E only uses them on weekends and during weekday evenings. The stretch of local track between 71st Avenue and 75th Avenue is only used in revenue service during late nights, when the E runs local.

There are also four tracks underneath this station, which are not visible from the platforms. An emergency exit located in the middle of the Jamaica-bound platform leads to this lower level. The two outer tracks lead to Jamaica Yard while the two center tracks are used for reversing trains from Forest Hills–71st Avenue and end at bumper blocks just below Kew Gardens–Union Turnpike station under the mainline tracks. The two center tracks used for reversing trains can be seen from Jamaica bound express train. On the west end of the station, there are two punch boxes one on the local and express tracks.

Ridership
In the 1970s, when the New York City Subway was at an all-time low, following the general trend of a decrease in ridership, the number of passengers using the 75th Avenue station decreased by 300,000 passengers.  In 2019, the station had 1,059,027 boardings, making it the 351st most used station in the -station system. This amounted to an average of 3,549 passengers per weekday.

Notes

References

External links 

 Track map of the area, from nycsubway.org
 75th Avenue entrance from Google Maps Street View
 75th Road entrance from Google Maps Street View
 Platforms from Google Maps Street View

IND Queens Boulevard Line stations
New York City Subway stations in Queens, New York
Railway stations in the United States opened in 1936
Forest Hills, Queens
1936 establishments in New York City